, one special election to the United States House of Representatives in 2023 was held during the 118th United States Congress, with another one scheduled to take place in the same year no earlier than June.

Summary 

|-
! 
| 
| 
| 2016
| data-sort-value=2023-02-21  | Incumbent died November 28, 2022.New member elected February 21, 2023.Democratic hold.
| nowrap | 

|-
! 
| 
| 
| 2010
| data-sort-value=2023-06-01 | Incumbent resigning June 1, 2023.New member to be elected on a date TBD
| nowrap | 

|}

Virginia's 4th congressional district 

Incumbent Democrat Donald McEachin died on November 28, 2022, of colorectal cancer, before he was seated to his fourth term in the 118th Congress.  Governor Glenn Youngkin called a special election for February 21, 2023, with the general election filing deadline set for December 23, 2022. The Democratic Party chose to hold its "firehouse primary" on December 20, just 8 days after the special election date was set.

State senator Jennifer McClellan won the primary in a landslide, and subsequently defeated pastor Leon Benjamin in the general election, becoming the first black woman to represent Virginia in Congress.

Rhode Island's 1st congressional district

Incumbent Democrat David Cicilline is resigning on June 1, 2023, to take a job at the Rhode Island Foundation. The date of the special election has not yet been set.

References 

 
2023